Kotli Than Singh is a village located in the Jalandhar district of Punjab, India.

Demographics
According to the 2011 Census, Kotli Than Singh had a population of 2,701. Males constituted 51.43% of the population and females 48.57%. The village had a literacy rate of 73.64%: male and female literacy rate was 77.61% and 69.44% respectively. In the village, 10.3% of the population was under 6 years of age. With 57.1% share in population, the Scheduled Castes (SCs) were the biggest community in the village.

References

Villages in Jalandhar district